Loucretia Chrysostomou (born 10 October 1992) is a Cypriot footballer who plays as a midfielder for First Division club Lefkothea Latsion and the Cyprus women's national team.

Career
Chrysostomou has been capped for the Cyprus national team, appearing for the team during the UEFA Women's Euro 2021 qualifying cycle.

International goals

References

External links
 
 
 

1992 births
Living people
Women's association football midfielders
Cypriot women's footballers
Cyprus women's international footballers
Apollon Ladies F.C. players